A Touch of Sturgeon is a collection by Theodore Sturgeon published in 1987.

Plot summary
A Touch of Sturgeon is a collection of eight stories.

Reception
Dave Langford reviewed A Touch of Sturgeon for White Dwarf #94, and stated that "perhaps the only long-established SF writer to have consistently worked not only with gadgets but also with strong human emotions."

Reviews
Review by Dan Chow (1987) in Locus, #319 August 1987
Review by Mike Moir (1988) in Vector 143

References

1987 novels